The Malatya Subregion (Turkish: Malatya Alt Bölgesi) (TRB1) is a statistical subregion in Turkey.

Provinces 

 Malatya Province (TRB11)
 Elazığ Province (TRB12)
 Bingöl Province (TRB13)
 Tunceli Province (TRB14)

See also 

 NUTS of Turkey

External links 
 TURKSTAT

Sources 
 ESPON Database

Statistical subregions of Turkey